Adam Wolniewicz (born 18 March 1993) is a Polish professional footballer who plays as a right-back for Śląsk Świętochłowice.

References

External links

1993 births
Living people
Polish footballers
Association football defenders
Górnik Zabrze players
GKS Jastrzębie players
Ekstraklasa players
I liga players
II liga players
Sportspeople from Ruda Śląska
21st-century Polish people